Big Brother 2010 may refer to:

 Big Brother 2010 (Finland)
 Big Brother 11 (UK)
 Celebrity Big Brother 7 (UK)
 Big Brother 2010 (U.S.)